Emmalocera flavodorsalis is a species of snout moth in the genus Emmalocera. It was described by Anthonie Johannes Theodorus Janse in 1922. It is found in South Africa.

References

Endemic moths of South Africa
Moths described in 1922
Emmalocera